Ingvar Albin Henrik Pettersson (19 January 1926 – 2 July 1996) was a Swedish race walker who won a bronze medal in the 50 km at the 1964 Summer Olympics.

References

External links 
 

1926 births
1996 deaths
Swedish male racewalkers
Athletes (track and field) at the 1964 Summer Olympics
Olympic athletes of Sweden
Olympic bronze medalists for Sweden
Medalists at the 1964 Summer Olympics
Olympic bronze medalists in athletics (track and field)